Arasanj-e Jadid (also Romanized as Ārāsanj-e Jadīd; also known as Ārāsanj, Arasan, Ārāsanj-e Bālā, Ārāsanj-e ‘Olyā, and Aresanīj) is a village in Zahray-ye Pain Rural District, in the Central District of Buin Zahra County, Qazvin Province, Iran. At the 2006 census, its population was 3,318, in 747 families. the old name of arasanj is araciana

References 

  3.Extracts: Metrum, observations on English metre; on the pseudo-rhythmus; on ...  Thomas Gray, Thomas James Mathias - 1814

Populated places in Buin Zahra County